Tazenda is a Sardinian ethnic pop-rock band. The group was formed in Sardinia in 1988 by Andrea Parodi, Gigi Camedda and Gino Marielli. The group's music is characterized by the influence from traditional Sardinian music; the lyrics of most of its songs are in Sardinian language (especially in its Logudorese dialectal variety) rather than Italian.

The name of the band was taken from Second Foundation, a novel of the Foundation series by Isaac Asimov. In the novel the planet "Tazenda" (the name of which comes from the English expression "Star's End") plays an important role. The choice, according to Tazenda, of this name was because of an assonance with their own language.

Discography

Studio albums
 1988 - Tazenda
 1991 - Murales
 1992 - Limba
 1995 - Fortza paris
 1998 - Sardinia
 2005 - ¡¡¡Bum-ba!!!
 2007 - Vida
 2008 - Madre Terra
 2012 - Ottantotto
 2021 – Antìstasis

Compilation albums
 1997 - Il sole di Tazenda

Live albums
 1993 - Il popolo rock
 2001 - Bios – Live in Ziqqurat
 2006 - Reunion
 2009 - Il nostro canto - Live in Sardinia
 2011 - Desvelos tour
 2015 - Il respiro live

Singles
 1988 – "A sa zente/S'urtima luche 1990 – "Carrasecare
 1991 – "Spunta la Luna dal monte (Disamparados)" (feat. Pierangelo Bertoli)
 1991 – "Mamoiada"
 1993 – "Il popolo rock"
 1997 – "Scaldaci Sole"
 2003 - "Bandidos"
 2007 - "Domo mia" (feat. Eros Ramazzotti)
 2007 - "La ricerca di te"
 2008 - "Madre Terra" (feat. Francesco Renga)
 2009 - "Piove luce" (feat. Gianluca Grignani)
 2008 - "L'aquila"
 2012 - "Mielacrime"
 2013 - "Il respiro del silenzio" (feat. Kekko Silvestre from Modà)
 2015 - "Amore nou"
 2018 - "Dentro le parole"

External links
 Official site 
 Article on Andrea Parodi, Repubblica.it, 18 October 2006. 
 Article on Andrea Parodi death, Corriere della Sera, 18 October 2006. 

Media
Youtube

 

Italian folk music groups
Italian pop music groups
Italian rock music groups
Music in Sardinia